Silver Rider Transit is a public transportation operator in Clark County. Silver Rider Transit operates in the rural portion of Clark county, with focus cities of Laughlin and Mesquite

History
Silver Rider Transit was incorporated in 2002, as a part of Nevada's DOT public rural ride program under the name Southern Nevada Transit Coalition

In 2008, Silver Rider Assumed transit operation for Boulder City

In 2010, Silver Rider Transit opened Harry Reid Transportation Center in Laughlin, honoring Senator Harry Reid, since Reid helped secure 3.5 million in funding for the transportation center. Previous Transportation center was located with the Las Vegas Metropolitan Police Department substation-jail.

In February 2022, Silver Rider Transit acquired hybrid electric buses for its Laughlin bus routes under a Federal grant, that was facilitated by Nevada DOT

Services

Demand response

Boulder City Transit
Silver Rider offers a daily Dail a Ride Service in Boulder City, that is open to all. Reservation in Boulder City isn't required.

Indian Springs Express Route
In Indian Springs, Silver Rider operates a weekly Dail a Ride service, open to all, that takes residents from Indian Springs to user indicated drop off location in Las Vegas. Dial a Ride in Indian Springs requires 24 hour advance reservation

Laughlin Transit 
In Laughlin, Silver rider offers Senior Dail a Ride services over the age of 60, to medical destinations in Bullhead City, AZ

Social Security Express
Social Security Express is a Dial a Ride service that operates once a month. Taking Laughlin Residents to the Needles Social Security office. Appointment to the Needles Social Security office is required.

Routes

References

External links

2002 establishments in Nevada
Bus transportation in Nevada
Public transportation in Nevada
Transportation in Clark County, Nevada
Transportation in the Las Vegas Valley